Caitlin Elisabeth Rose (born June 23, 1987) is a country singer and songwriter from Nashville, Tennessee. She has released three albums, Own Side Now (2010), The Stand-In (2013) and Cazimi (2022). She also recorded two Arctic Monkeys songs for Record Store Day in 2012.

Career
Rose was previously the lead singer of Nashville indie band Save Macaulay, on local label Theory 8 until 2007. As a solo artist, she signed to BMI in 2008. The title track of her seven-track 2008 EP, Dead Flowers, is a cover of a Rolling Stones song.

Her first album, Own Side Now, was released by Names Records in August 2010. Her vocal performance and lyrics have led to comparisons to Loretta Lynn, Patsy Cline, and Iris DeMent. Claire Suddath of Time magazine named Own Side Now one of the Top 10 Albums of 2011, ranking it at No. 7.

Her next studio album The Stand-In was released on February 25, 2013.

After a 9-year gap, she released a new album Cazimi on November 18, 2022.

Discography

Albums

Track listings
Dead Flowers; EP, 2008
 Shotgun Wedding
 Answer in One of These Bottles
 Three Cigarettes in an Ashtray
 Docket
 Gorilla Man
 Dead Flowers
 T-shirt

Own Side Now; album, 2010
 Learning to Ride
 Own Side
 For the Rabbits
 Shanghai Cigarettes
 New York
 Spare Me (Fetzer's Blues)
 Things Change
 That's Alright
 Sinful Wishing Well
 Coming Up

Piledriver Waltz; 7-inch, 2012 (covers of two Arctic Monkeys songs, limited edition vinyl release for Record Store Day 2012)
 Piledriver Waltz
 Love Is a Laserquest

The Stand-In; album, February 25, 2013
"No One to Call"
"I Was Cruel"
"Waitin'"
"Only a Clown"
"Dallas"
"Pink Champagne"
"Golden Boy"
"Silver Sings"
"Everywhere I Go"
"When I'm Gone"
"Menagerie" 
"Old Numbers"

Music videos

Personal life
Rose's mother is country songwriter Liz Rose (who shares a Grammy nomination for writing with Taylor Swift). She was born in Dallas, Texas, and her family moved to Nashville in 1994. She attended community college in Nashville for a year before leaving to focus on music. Rose is a big fan of astrology and her 2022 album is named Cazimi, an astrological term for when the sun and another planet are perfectly conjoined.

References

External links

People from Nashville, Tennessee
American alternative country singers
American women country singers
American country singer-songwriters
Living people
1987 births
Singer-songwriters from Tennessee
21st-century American singers
21st-century American women singers
Country musicians from Tennessee
ATO Records artists